Miss Belgium 2020 was the 52nd edition of the Miss Belgium pageant, held on January 11, 2020 at the Plopsaland Theater in De Panne, Belgium. Elena Castro Suarez of Antwerp crowned her successor Céline Van Ouytsel of Antwerp at end of the event. Van Ouytsel represented Belgium at the Miss World 2021 pageant, but was unplaced.

Results

Special Awards

Contestants
32 delegates will compete for the crown:

Observations
For the first time since 2013, the election was live streamed on the RTL Play1 platform. The pageant featured 32 candidates, while there were only 30 during the five previous elections.

During the evening gown competition part of the coronation night, Céline Van Ouytsel tripped on the hem of her dress causing her to fall on stage and even lost a bra which was inadvertently stuck in her long puffy sleeves. The fallen bra remained in the middle of the stage for a few minutes, and it was fully visible to the camera as the next contestant walked onstage. It was also reported that some finalists nearly fell in the stage during the swimsuit competition. The incident was widely reported in the media, to the point that Céline Van Ouytsel was interviewed about it and had to give her own comments on what exactly happened. Despite the incident, she managed to win the crown.

References

External links

Miss Belgium
2020 beauty pageants
2020 in Belgium